Mollazehi is a Baloch tribe found in Hiduj and Northern Sarbaz. They are known as (Mollazadeh) in the Sarbaz County. They are Descendants of Mir Pordel Khan rend dagarani, who they claim to have migrated in the early 19th century from Mand in the Kech District of today's Balochistan province of Iran.

Etymology
Mollazahi in Balochi means Descendants of Mollas (Wisdom seeker.)

Origins
Mollazehi's of Hiduj and Northern Sarbaz County are one of the 16 clans of the Rinds. Rind clans include: Askani, Bangizai, Bugani, Dagarani, Gazakandi, Gohramzai, Kahmaki, Kolagi, Miranzai, Mollazehi, Nohani, Perozai, Shahalzai, Shahozai, Kiazai, Maheer and Shelo-Mir.

References

Baloch tribes
Ethnic groups in Iran